The WSG Open is a tournament for professional female tennis players played on outdoor clay courts. The event is classified as a $60,000 ITF Women's Circuit tournament and has been held in Warsaw, Poland, since 2017. 

The Powiat Poznański Open was classified as a $75,000 tournament and held in Sobota, Poland, on outdoor clay courts from 2014 to 2015.

The Salwator Cup was classified as a $100,000+H tournament and held in Kraków, Poland, on indoor hardcourts in 2008.

Past finals

Singles

Doubles

External links
 
 ITF search
  

ITF Women's World Tennis Tour
Recurring sporting events established in 2017
Clay court tennis tournaments
Tennis tournaments in Poland
 
Recurring sporting events established in 2014
Recurring sporting events disestablished in 2015
Defunct tennis tournaments in Europe
Defunct sports competitions in Poland
Hard court tennis tournaments
Recurring sporting events established in 2008
Recurring sporting events disestablished in 2008